Vitalie Pîrlog (born 28 July 1974) is a Moldovan politician.

Education and early career 

Between 1992 and 1997, he studied at the Free International University of Moldova (Chişinău) (Law Department), receiving a Degree in International Law. Pîrlog began his career in 1993 as Legal Adviser within an international private company. From 1997 till 2001, he served as Senior Adviser in the Document Services of the Office of the President of Moldova. In January 2001 he was appointed Deputy Director of the Governmental Agent and International Relations Department of the Ministry of Justice. Since 2001 Vitalie Pîrlog has represented the Government of Moldova before the European Court of Human Rights, cumulating at the same time the position of Director of International Relations and European Integration Department of the Ministry of Justice. 

In the period 2001-2005, he was a member (as national expert) of the Steering Committee for Human Rights (CDDH) of the Council of Europe, the European Commission for Justice Effectiveness of the Council of Europe, the Committee of Experts for the Improvement of the Procedures for the Protection of Human Rights (one of the two expert-committees subordinate to the CDDH). Pîrlog was also Head of the Moldavian Delegation at the European Committee on Crime Problems of the Council of Europe. 

After 2005 he worked within the Permanent Governmental Commission on the enforcement of the European Court of Human Rights final decisions against the Republic of Moldova. 

On 20 September 2006, Pîrlog became Justice Minister in the Vasile Tarlev cabinet. He kept this post during the Zinaida Greceanîi Cabinets.

Prime Minister of Moldova 
 

Zinaida Greceanîi resigned on September 9, 2009, saying she was unable to simultaneously hold the posts of prime minister and member of the Moldovan Parliament at the same time. On September 10, 2009, Moldova’s President Vladimir Voronin signed a decree appointing the departing Justice Minister Vitalie Pîrlog as acting prime minister from September 14 until a new government is formed by Alliance for European Integration. Vitalie Pîrlog acted as Prime Minister until the members of the new government took an oath; the president of Moldova nominated Vlad Filat as the new prime minister.

Interpol 
 
At the 85th General Assembly of INTERPOL held in Bali, Indonesia, on November 7-10, 2016 was elected by a majority of votes as Member of the Commission for the Control of INTERPOL's Files (CCF) for a term of office for five years. On March 11, 2017, Vitalie Pirlog was elected Chairperson of the Commission for the Control of INTERPOL's Files

Following Career

n period 2009-2017 was President of NGO Alliance for justice and human rights.
In 2013 he obtained the title of Ph.D. in Law with the thesis entitled "The Compatibility of the European Convention on Human Rights with the Constitution of the Republic of Moldova in the field of freedom of expression".
Between December 21st 2017 - February 21st, 2018 he served as Director of the Security and Intelligence Service of the Republic of Moldova, being appointed by the Parliament.
He is fluent in Romanian, French and Russian.

Notes

1974 births
Living people
People from Nisporeni District
Prime Ministers of Moldova
Moldovan jurists
Moldovan Ministers of Justice